Abaga (or Wagama) is a nearly extinct Trans–New Guinea language of Papua New Guinea. It appears to be related to Kamono and Yagaria.

The classification of Abaga is disputed. It may actually be a Kamano-Yagaria language, and not a Finisterre-Huon language with heavy influence as proposed before.

References

Critically endangered languages
Languages of Eastern Highlands Province
Endangered Papuan languages